Heather Elizabeth Parisi (born January 27, 1960) is an American-born Italian dancer, singer and television personality. She was one of the most popular personalities of Italian television from the late 1970s  to the 1990s. As of 2011, she and her family mainly live in Hong Kong.

Life and career
Born in Los Angeles, Parisi worked in the United States for the San Francisco Ballet and the American Ballet Theatre in New York City. During a vacation in Italy, she was noticed by the choreographer Franco Miseria,  who made her audition for RAI. In 1979, Parisi debuted on the show Luna Park, hosted by Pippo Baudo.

Her rise as a television star took place in the fall of the same year, with the first edition of the Saturday night show Fantastico, which had very high ratings (an average of 23.6 million viewers). In each episode, Parisi performed a ballet and interpreted the opening song "Disco Bambina." The song became a hit, peaking several weeks at first place on the Italian hit parade.

Parisi was cast in four more editions of Fantastico and in other successful variety shows, and she also had several other musical hits, including the song "Cicale" which ranked first at the hit parade for four weeks between 1981 and 1982. She slowed down her activities in the mid-'90s.

During the COVID-19 Pandemic, Parisi chose to remain unvaccinated. On her website in December 2021, Parisi logged an entry entitled "Damned for Eternity"  in which she told women that they "should be ashamed" of having children vaccinated against COVID-19 and that it was "criminal". In a different post, Parisi stated that "For me, being socially responsible is one of the most overestimated virtues."

Filmography

As an actress

As a director and screenwriter

Other appearances

Discography
Album
     1981 - Cicale & Company (CGD, CGD 20276)
     1983 - Ginnastica fantastica (Polydor, 815 721 1)
     1983 - Il fantastico mondo di Heather Parisi (reprint of  Cicale & Company with three new songs)
     1991 - HP (Mercury, 846 417-1)
     1991 - Io, Pinocchio (Mercury, 510 738-2)

Singles 
 
     1979 - Disco bambina/Blackout (CGD, CGD 10200)
     1981 - Ti rockerò/Lucky girl (CGD, CGD 10302)
     1981 - Cicale/Mr. pulce (CGD, CGD 10349)
     1981 - Quando i grilli cantano (CGD, CGD YD 601) promo juke box
     1983 - Radiostelle/Alle corde (CGD, CGD 10456)
     1983 - Ceralacca/Raghjayda (Polydor, 815-750-7)
     1984 - Crilù/No words (Polydor, 881-420-7)
 1984 - Ciao ciao/Maschio (Polydor, 821697-7)
     1985 - Crilù in Bangkok/Morning in Tokyo (Polydor, 881 924-1, 12") (as Angel Program) 
     1986 - Teleblù/Videolips (Polydor, 883-952-7)
     1987 - Dolceamaro/All'ultimo respiro (Polydor, 887-180-7)
     1987 - Baby come back/I'm hot (White Records, 109 428)
     1989 - Faccia a faccia/Feelings come and go (Polydor, 871-572-7)
     1989 - Livido/Livido (Instrumental Version) (Polydor, 873-192-7)
     1991 - Pinocchio/Se te ne vai (Polydor, 866 194 7)

References

External links 

 

1960 births
Living people
People from Los Angeles
Italian television personalities
Italian women singers
Italian expatriates in Hong Kong
American emigrants to Italy
American people of Italian descent
People of Calabrian descent
American expatriates in Italy
American expatriates in Hong Kong
Hong Kong people of Italian descent